= Enugula Viraswamayya =

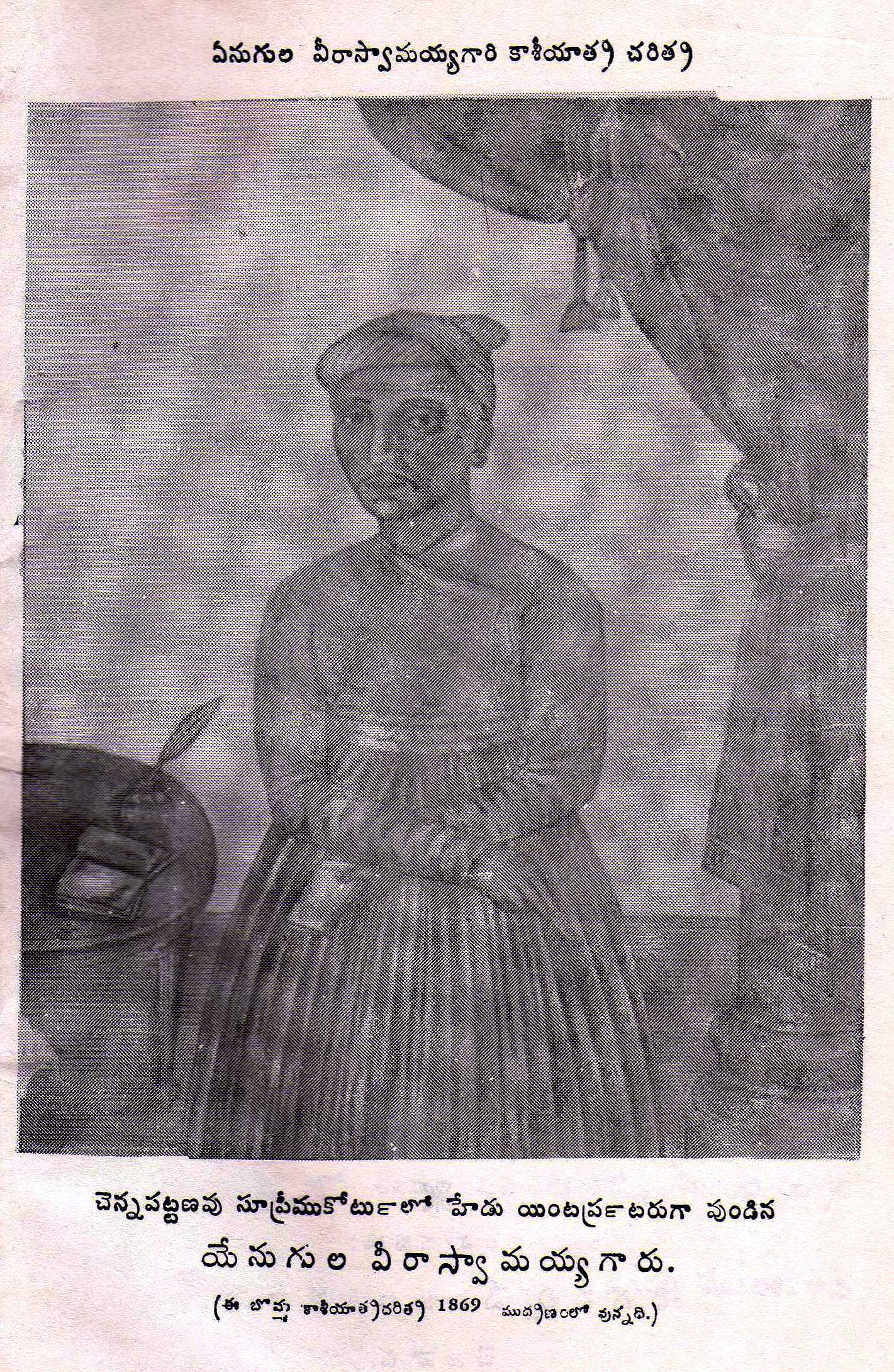
Enugula viraswamayya

Enugula Viraswamayya or Enugula Viraswami (1780 - 1836) Telugu scholar, writer and traveller. He was a prominent Telugu Niyogi Brahmin. He wrote "Kasi Yatra Charitra" Travelogue in Telugu about his pilgrimage to Varanasi. The book was first published in 1838, again in 1869 (Madras). This is the first remarkable travelogue published in Telugu. This book written in the form of daily letters by the author to his friend Srinivasa Pillai at Komateawarapuram, narrates the salient aspects of his pilgrimage. It is written in colloquial language and was printed thrice in 1838, 1869 and 1941. It brings out the ethos, customs and traditions of ancient India.

== Early life and education ==
He was born on 1780 in Madras (now Chennai). He was a Niyogi Brahmin and from an early age studied English, Telugu, Sanskrit, and Tamil languages. He joined the Company at the age of 12 to work as a translator (dubasi), eventually rising to the post of "head interpreter" of the Madras Supreme court.

== Pilgrimage ==
He started at Madras (Now Chennai) on 18 May 1830 on a long tour of this country. During his historical journey he covered many places in India. He stayed at places such as Tirupati, Kadapa, Ahobilam, Hyderabad, Vemulavada, Nirmal, Dhanora, Nagpur, Ramatenki, Jabalpur, Reema, Mirjapur, Prayaga, Kasi, Patna, Gaya, Rajmahal, Krishnanagar, Calcutta, Gopalpur, Cuttack, Puri-Jagannath, Chilka Lake, Ganjam, Chatrapur, Berhampur, Srikakulam, Vizianagram, Simhachalam, Rajahmundry, Ryali, Machilipaitnam, Bapatla, Chinna Ganjam, Nellore, Gudur, Naidupet, Sullurpet, Ponneri and returned to Madras on 3 September 1831. Hundreds of other historically important places were also visited by him in this pilgrimage to Kasi, Prayag etc. During this journey he maintained a journal. The journal is particularly valuable to us as it throws much light on the conditions of the country during the period indicated above. He is a keen observer and his observations on Hindu holy places, rivers, on religions such as Hinduism, Islam, Christianity, Hindu mythology, astronomy, the customs, manners, castes, laws of the late Governments of the several places make a very interesting and absorbing study. The journal of Veeraswamy is therefore an important literary source for the study of the conditions of India in the years 1830–31 and the first half of the nineteenth century.

== Translations ==
His work Kasiyatra Charitra was translated into English language by P. Sitapati and V. Purushottam entitled Enugula Veeraswamy's Journal and published by Andhra Pradesh Government Oriental Manuscripts Library and Research Institute in 1973. An elaborate introduction was written by the joint-director Vadlamudi Gopalakrishnaiah.
